Sychnovalva flavida is a species of moth of the family Tortricidae. It is found in Loja Province, Ecuador.

The wingspan is about 21 mm. The ground colour of the forewings is cream with a slight admixture of yellowish brown. The strigulae (fine streaks) and suffusions are brownish and the markings are brown with some dark brown spots. The hindwings are cream white with some pale brownish spots.

Etymology
The species name refers to the colouration of the forewings and is derived from Latin flavida (meaning yellowish).

References

	

Moths described in 2008
Archipini